This list of current cities, towns, unincorporated communities, counties, and other recognized places in the U.S. state of Delaware also includes information on the number and names of counties in which the place lies, and its lower and upper zip code bounds, if applicable.

See also
List of cities in Delaware
List of counties in Delaware
List of hundreds of Delaware

References

USGS Fips55 database

 
Delaware